Aleksandr Mozhayev (born 5 August 1958) is a Soviet fencer. He won a bronze medal in the team épée event at the 1980 Summer Olympics.

References

1958 births
Living people
Russian male fencers
Soviet male fencers
Olympic fencers of the Soviet Union
Fencers at the 1980 Summer Olympics
Olympic bronze medalists for the Soviet Union
Olympic medalists in fencing
Sportspeople from Vladikavkaz
Medalists at the 1980 Summer Olympics